"I Know What You Want" is a song written by American rapper Busta Rhymes, and produced by Rick Rock for Rhymes' sixth album It Ain't Safe No More..., released on November 26, 2002. The song is a duet with American singer Mariah Carey, and was co-written by Rah Digga, Rampage, Rick Rock, and Spliff Star. It also includes verses from Rhymes' group, the Flipmode Squad: Spliff Star, Baby Sham, Rah Digga, and Rampage.

Released as the second single from It Ain't Safe No More on February 24, 2003, it was a hit across the world, peaking at number 3 in the United States, Australia, and the United Kingdom. Rhymes' previous single, "Make It Clap," had failed to reach the top forty on the U.S. Billboard Hot 100 chart. "I Know What You Want" stayed in the top forty for twenty-one weeks, and was ranked 17 on the Hot 100 2003 year-end chart. For Carey, it was a return to form after a string of unsuccessful singles, and it became one of her biggest hits in years. Columbia Records later included it on her first remix album The Remixes (2003) and the British and Japanese reissues of Carey's ninth studio album Charmbracelet (2002).

The plotline for the video for "I Know What You Want" was continued in the video for the 2021 single "Where I Belong", in which Rhymes collaborated again with Carey.

Critical reception
In Billboard, Brian Garrity wrote that on "I Know What You Want," Busta Rhymes "takes an R&B turn". Amazon.com editor Dalton Higgins wrote that in this duet Busta "croons".

Commercial performance
The song charted at number 3 on the Billboard Hot 100 making it Rhymes' highest charting song at the time until 2005 and Carey's then most-recent top five hit since her 2001 single, "Loverboy". The song has sold 175,000 copies in the UK.

Sampling
The song has been sampled in the song "I Got You" by Trippie Redd. Also this song has been sampled by G-Unit in a song called "Baby if you get on your knees"   (2020) and "Where I Belong", the 2021 follow up duet by Rhymes and Carey.

Music video
The music video was directed by Chris Robinson. It features Busta Rhymes, the Flipmode Squad, and Carey lounging around an expensive mansion as they debate whether they "know what they want". During Carey's appearance, her jewelry brand "Automatic Princess" was advertised. Meanwhile, Busta watches over the female interest of the video played by video vixen La'Shontae "Tae" Heckard, as she reads a Frank Miller-stylized graphic novel. Her husband in the video is played by martial artist and actor Michael Jai White. A brief animated sequence drawn from the graphic novel is featured. The video premiered on BET Access Granted on April 17, 2003. Some of the music video is used in Busta Rhymes' new music video "Where I Belong".

Formats and track listings
Canadian CD single
 "I Know What You Want" (Radio Edit)
 "I Know What You Want" (Instrumental Radio Edit)

European CD single
 "I Know What You Want" (Album Version)
 "Break Ya Neck"

Australian/European CD maxi-single
 "I Know What You Want" (Album Version)
 "Break Ya Neck"
 "I Know What You Want" (Instrumental)
 "I Know What You Want" (Video)

UK CD maxi-single
 "I Know What You Want"
 "Call the Ambulance" (Remix featuring M.O.P. & Rah Digga)
 "Call the Ambulance" (featuring Rampage)
 "I Know What You Want" (Video)

Charts

Weekly charts

Year-end charts

Certifications

Release history

See also
List of Romanian Top 100 number ones of the 2000s

References

External links
Busta Rhymes website

2002 songs
2003 singles
Busta Rhymes songs
European Hot 100 Singles number-one singles
Mariah Carey songs
Music videos directed by Chris Robinson (director)
Number-one singles in Hungary
Number-one singles in Poland
Number-one singles in Romania
Songs written by Busta Rhymes
Songs written by Rick Rock